Prasophyllum campestre, commonly known as the sandplain leek orchid, or inland leek orchid, is a species of orchid endemic to eastern Australia. It has a single tubular, yellowish-green leaf and up to twenty greenish, strongly scented flowers with red, purplish, brown or white marks. It grows in the drier parts of Queensland, New South Wales and Victoria.

Description
Prasophyllum campestre is a terrestrial, perennial, deciduous, herb with an underground tuber and a single tube-shaped, yellowish-green leaf. As with others in the genus, the flowers are inverted so that the labellum is above the column rather than below it. There is a fleshy, greenish callus in the centre of the labellum. Flowering occurs from September and October.

Taxonomy and naming
Prasophyllum campestre was first formally described in 1991 by Robert Bates and David Jones from a specimen collected near Nymagee and the description was published in Australian Orchid Research. The specific epithet (campestre) is a Latin word meaning "of or pertaining to fields", referring to the habitat of this species.

Distribution and habitat
The inland leek orchid grows in semi arid areas in fertile, water-retaining soil. It occurs in inland areas of southern Queensland, New South Wales and northern Victoria.

References

External links 
 
 

campestre
Flora of New South Wales
Flora of Queensland
Flora of Victoria (Australia)
Endemic orchids of Australia
Plants described in 1991